László Barsi (born 16 July 1962) is a Hungarian weightlifter. He competed at the 1988 Summer Olympics and the 1992 Summer Olympics.

References

External links
 

1962 births
Living people
Hungarian male weightlifters
Olympic weightlifters of Hungary
Weightlifters at the 1988 Summer Olympics
Weightlifters at the 1992 Summer Olympics
Sportspeople from Miskolc
World Weightlifting Championships medalists